Danny Lau Dan (born 13 January 1944) is a Hong Kong actor.

Works 
Lau is known to portray good characters, but could play cunning and sly characters with ease (includes The Bund and Land of Wealth). He is most noted for being the only actor to play the role of Hong Qigong in the TV series adaptations of Louis Cha's novels The Legend of the Condor Heroes and The Return of the Condor Heroes for four times in a row. Lau is also well known for playing the role of the patriarch of a family in A Kindred Spirit. He also appeared in the Latvian/Hong Kong film, Hong Kong Confidential (Amaya).

He was formerly an appointed member of Sai Kung District Council.

Personal life
Lau's son, Hawick Lau, also formerly a TVB actor, was married to the famous mainland actress Yang Mi.

Filmography
 The Water Margin (1972)
 The Romantic Swordsman (1978)
 Over the Rainbow (1979)
 The Bund (1980)
 Lonely Hunter (1981)
 The Restless Trio (1982)
 The Legend of the Condor Heroes (1982) & (1994)
 The Return of the Condor Heroes (1983) & (1995)
 The Smiling, Proud Wanderer (1984)
 The Duke of Mount Deer (1984)
 The New Adventures of Chor Lau-heung (1984)
 The Rough Ride (1985)
 New Heavenly Sword and Dragon Sabre (1986)
 The Return of Luk Siu Fung (1986)
 The Grand Canal (1987)
 My Father's Son (1988)
 Ghost is your wife (Vợ Là Ma) ATV series (1990)
 Silver Tycoon (1992)
 The Heaven Sword and Dragon Saber (1993)
 A Kindred Spirit (1995)
 Demi-Gods and Semi-Devils (1997)
 Journey to the West II (1998)
 The Heaven Sword and Dragon Saber (2000)
 Crimson Sabre (2000)
 The Stamp of Love (2001)
 Virtues of Harmony (2001)
 Where the Legend Begins (2002)
 Golden Faith (2002)
 Virtues of Harmony II (2003)
 Back to Square One (2003)
 Revolving Doors of Vengeance (2005)
 Food for Life (2005)
 Trimming Success (2006)
 War and Destiny (2006)
 Land of Wealth (2006)
 The Seventh Day (2008)
 Speech of Silence (2008)
 The Gem of Life (2008)
 Off Pedder (2009)
 Beyond the Realm of Conscience (2009)
 Cupid Stupid (2010)
 Ghost Writer (2010)
 Some Day (2010)
 Amaya (2010)
 Twilight Investigation (2010)
 Links to Temptation (2010)
 Only You (2011)
 The Other Truth (2011)
 Forensic Heroes III (2011)
 When Heaven Burns (2011)
 Let It Be Love (2012)
 Come Home Love (2012-2015)
 Sergeant Tabloid (2013)
 Noblesse Oblige (2014)
 Lost in Wrestling (2015)
 Law dis-Order (2016)
Come Home Love: Lo and Behold (2017–Present)

References 

1944 births
Living people
District councillors of Sai Kung District
Hong Kong male film actors
Hong Kong male television actors
Liberal Party (Hong Kong) politicians
Hong Kong people of Shandong descent
People from Weihai
20th-century Hong Kong male actors
21st-century Hong Kong male actors